Ballyalla Lake, also known as Ballyallia Lough, is a small lake on the River Fergus, north of the town of Ennis in County Clare, Ireland. It is protected by the Irish National Parks and Wildlife Service as a wildfowl sanctuary, meaning that shooting game birds is not allowed at the lake.

References

Ballyallia
Ramsar sites in the Republic of Ireland
Special Areas of Conservation in the Republic of Ireland